Central Elgin Collegiate Institute is the smallest of three public secondary schools in St. Thomas, Ontario, Canada.

At one time the school was part of the International Baccalaureate Organization; however, that status is no longer recognized. Central's current principal is Shelly Duben.

Recent athletic accomplishments

2010 Varsity Boys Hockey WOSSAA Bronze Medalists
2010 Varsity Girls Soccer WOSSAA Champions
2010 Girls Curling Team OFSAA Silver Medalists
4 CECI Wrestlers medaled at OFSAA 2011
2012 baseball team second in TVRAA and third in WOSSAA
2012 OFSAA Gold Medalist – Long Jump
2012 Varsity Boys Football TVRAA South East Champions – Undefeated Season
2015 Math Team Champions

Notable alumni
Rachel McAdams (b. 1978), film actress
Joe Thornton (b. 1979), professional ice hockey player for San Jose Sharks, Boston Bruins, and the Canadian national team

See also
List of high schools in Ontario

References

External links
CECI's Web Site
CECI Alumni Web Site
School Profile at TVDSB

High schools in St. Thomas, Ontario
Educational institutions established in 1954
1954 establishments in Ontario